Nina Catach (born 1923 in Cairo, Egypt – died 1997 in Paris, France) was a French linguist and linguistic historian who specialized in the history of French orthography. She published many notable books.

She had a son and a daughter, Irène Rosier-Catach, a linguist and philosopher, and Laurent Catach, an editor of Dictionnaire Le Robert.

Works
 L'orthographe française, 1980
 Orthographe et lexicographie, 1981
 Les listes orthographiques de base du français, 1984 
 'New linguistic approaches to a theory of writing'. In: Battestini, S.P.X. (ed.) Georgetown University Round Table on Languages and Linguistics 1986. Washington, DC: Georgetown University Press (1986), pp. 161–174.
 Un Dictionnaire historique de l'orthographe française, Larousse, 1994

References

1923 births
1997 deaths
Linguists from France
Women linguists
20th-century linguists
Egyptian emigrants to France